Magnum, P.I. is an American action drama television series starring Tom Selleck as Thomas Magnum, a private investigator in Hawaii. The series ran on CBS, which broadcast 162 first-run episodes over eight seasons, from December 11, 1980, to May 1, 1988.

Series overview

Episodes

Season 1 (1980–81)

Season 2 (1981–82)

Season 3 (1982–83)
"Did You See the Sunrise?", "The Eighth Part of the Village", "Past Tense", "Black on White", "Flashback", "Heal Thyself" and "Faith and Begorrah" were the highest-rated episodes in the show's history, and were all respectively the highest-rated television events at all during their initial broadcasts.

Season 4 (1983–84)

Season 5 (1984–85)

Season 6 (1985–86)

Season 7 (1986–87)

Season 8 (1987–88)
The episodes "Tiger's Fan" and "A Girl Named Sue" were the two most-watched episodes of this season, garnering the highest ratings both during their initial broadcasts and during their subsequent reruns.

References

External links

 
 
 Magnum Mania

Magnum P.I.
Episodes
Television about the internment of Japanese Americans
it:Episodi di Magnum, P.I. (prima stagione)